Zenji is a puzzle game designed by Matthew Hubbard and published by Activision in 1984. It was released for the Atari 5200, Atari 8-bit family, ColecoVision, Commodore 64, MSX, and ZX Spectrum. Hubbard previously wrote Dolphin for the Atari 2600.

Gameplay

Zenji is a maze-based game, wherein the player controls a "disembodied, Mandarin-style head". The challenge is to connect a series of randomly rotated maze-segments in an attempt to align them with a glowing artifact, known as "the source", which acts as each maze's focal point. The player moves to each segment of the maze and attempts to rotate that portion so that the source's green light can shine into that region, signifying a correct alignment. If all  portions of the maze are connected successfully before the end of a timer, the player is awarded points, and moves on to the next stage. Successive mazes introduce greater complexity and hazards to the player's survival.

Reception
In the conclusion of the review for the Commodore 64 edition of Zenji, the author in Compute! Gazette stated, "Although final understanding of the source remains elusive, Zenji is an undeniably enjoyable game". Of note, the last paragraph of the review also stated that, "Zenji appears to be a multiplayer game...up to 8 acolytes at a time...There's no documentation concerning this, however."

Gregg Williams reviewed the game for Computer Gaming World, and stated that "If you like geometric puzzles and games like Othello, you should like Zenji. It is a potential classic and gives exceptional value for the money."

Computer and Video Games rated the ColecoVision version 90% in 1989.

References

External links

Activision games
Atari 5200 games
Atari 8-bit family games
ColecoVision games
Commodore 64 games
MSX games
Puzzle video games
ZX Spectrum games
1984 video games
Video games developed in the United States